Ketou Township is a township of Xinhua County in Hunan, China. The township was created in 1956 and the township of Ruxi was merged to it in 1995.

The township is located in the southeast of the county, it is bordered by Shangmei Subdistrict to the north, by Fenglin Subdistrict to the northeast, by the town of Shichongkou and Weishan Township to the southeast, by the two towns of Yangxi and Luguan to the west. The town has 19 villages under its jurisdiction in 2017.

Administrative division
In 2017, Ketou Township transferred Jiangxi Village to Shangmei Subdistrict, the township has 19 villages under its jurisdiction.

19 villages
 Dalang Village
 Furongzhai Village
 Huangxi Village
 Huxia Village
 Ketou Village
 Matian Village
 Ruxi Village
 Sanbanqiao Village
 Shanxia Village
 Shizhang Village
 Taolin Village
 Xiaolang Village
 Xiazhuang Village
 Xinghuo Village
 Yanxia Village
 Youyi Village
 Yuanyi Village
 Zhongxin Village
 Zhushan Village

Jiangxi Village
 Jiangxi Village was moved to Shangmei Town, soon transferred to Shangmei Subdistrict in November 2017.

References

External links

Divisions of Xinhua County